United Nations Security Council Resolution 43, adopted unanimously on April 1, 1948, notes the increasing violence and disorder in Palestine,  calling upon the Jewish Agency for Palestine and the Arab Higher Committee to make representatives available to the Security Council to arrange and enforce a truce.  The Resolution further calls upon armed Arab and Jewish groups to cease acts of violence immediately.

See also
Arab–Israeli conflict
List of United Nations Security Council Resolutions 1 to 100 (1946–1953)
United Nations Security Council Resolution 46
United Nations Security Council Resolution 48
United Nations Security Council Resolution 49
United Nations Security Council Resolution 50

References
Text of the Resolution at undocs.org

External links
 

 0043
 0043
Mandatory Palestine
 0043
1948 in Israel
April 1948 events